Salvatore Giuliano is an opera in one act by Lorenzo Ferrero to an Italian-language libretto by Giuseppe Di Leva, which was conceived to be performed in tandem with Pietro  Mascagni's Cavalleria rusticana. The work was commissioned by the Teatro dell'Opera di Roma and premiered there on 25 January 1986. 

Set in Sicily, the story is based on the life of the legendary historical figure Salvatore Giuliano (1922–1950), a Sicilian peasant who fought the Italian authorities in the name of a separatist movement.

Performance history
The original production directed by Luciano Damiani and conducted by Gustav Kuhn became the subject of a monograph entitled Nascita di un'opera: Salvatore Giuliano, which was published in 1987 by photographer Lorenzo Capellini. The opera had two subsequent new productions in Germany, one conducted by Frank Cramer which was performed at Mainfranken Theater Würzburg on 13 May 1987 and the second conducted by Johannes Wedekind at the Staatstheater Kassel on 8 June 1996.

Roles

Synopsis
Place: Western Sicily, Montelepre and surrounding mountains  
Time: The second half of the 1940s

In an empty village at dawn a shot is heard and there is a glimpse of a man running. When the village awakes a representative of EVIS, the Volunteer Army for the Independence of Sicily, arrives to address the inhabitants and to introduce Salvatore Giuliano to them. In his speech, the man incites the villagers to endorse EVIS' fight for independence. After pledging his support to the cause, Giuliano remains alone with his lieutenant, Gaspare Pisciotta. They are discussing how to liberate Giuliano's mother from prison when, unexpectedly, she returns to him escorted by a Mafioso. Giuliano realizes that he has contracted a debt with the Mafia. 

In his mountain stronghold, Giuliano relates his life story to Maria, a Swedish journalist who came to interview him. He recalls that he became a bandit by chance, due to poverty and the injustice of the Italian state. He confesses that he hopes for a pardon and emigration to America. The interview is interrupted by the Mafioso who returned to claim his dues. He asks Giuliano to attack the communists' Labour Day parade at Portella della Ginestra in exchange for Mafia protection and help with his request for amnesty. Giuliano agrees. 

After the massacre, Colonel Ugo Luca, the head of the newly formed special police force for the suppression of banditry, ponders about the Minister's order to liquidate Giuliano because by now he knows too much. In the meantime, at his sister's wedding reception Giuliano carries out an irreparable act and executes five Mafiosi, who came to inform him that a reward for his capture has been set by the authorities in Rome. Appalled by this crime the Mafioso meets Colonel Luca and, while the police are carrying away the corpses, they agree to unite their forces against Giuliano. Pisciotta is summoned to the Colonel, who succeeds in convincing him to betray Giuliano, in exchange for his own life. In a desperate final attempt, Pisciotta tries to persuade Giuliano to escape but he refuses to leave. In the empty village, as in the beginning, the shadows of two men appear on the background: one shoots and the other falls. The village lights go out and the voice of a woman is heard calling: "Giuliano!"

Notable arias and excerpts
The orchestral Intermezzo depicting the Portella della Ginestra massacre and Giuliano's aria "Poi andrò in America" were arranged as excerpts for concert performance. The aria was first performed at the Palm Beach Opera in February, 1992.

See also
 Salvatore Giuliano, a 1962 Italian film directed by Francesco Rosi
The Sicilian, a novel by Mario Puzo based on the life of Salvatore Giuliano
The Sicilian, a film based on the novel, directed by Michael Cimino

References
Citations

Bibliography
 Bagnoli, Giorgio, ed. (1993). The La Scala Encyclopedia of the Opera. New York: Simon & Schuster.  
 Capellini, Lorenzo (1987). Nascita di un'opera: Salvatore Giuliano. Bologna: Nuova Alfa Editoriale. 
 Gelli, Piero, ed. (2007). Dizionario dell'Opera 2008 entries: "Lorenzo Ferrero," "Salvatore Giuliano." Milano: Baldini Castoldi Dalai editore. 
 Holden, Amanda, ed. (2001). The New Penguin Opera Guide. London: Penguin Books. 
 Iesuè, Alberto (1988). Storia della musica. Volume 1. Padova: Franco Muzzio & C editore SpA.  
 Napoli, Ettore (2010). Guida alla musica sinfonica. Varese: Zecchini Editore. 
 Renda, Francesco (2002). Salvatore Giuliano: Una biografia storica. Palermo: Sellerio editore.   
 Sadie, Stanley, ed. (1992-2002). The New Grove Dictionary of Opera. London: Macmillan Publishers.

External links

 Casa Ricordi Catalogue
 Title page of sheet music at Casa Ricordi Digital Collection
 Salvatore Giuliano on YouTube

Operas
Operas by Lorenzo Ferrero
1986 operas
One-act operas
Italian-language operas
Operas set in Sicily
Operas set in the 20th century
Operas based on real people
Operas based on actual events
Cultural depictions of male criminals
Cultural depictions of Italian men
Works about Italian bandits
Salvatore Giuliano